Radwan Ajam  is a Syrian football midfielder who played for Syria in the 1988 Asian Cup.

International Record

References

Syrian footballers
Association football midfielders
1988 AFC Asian Cup players
Syria international footballers
1965 births
Living people